Survivor: Camarines (Hisardut Ai Camarines) was the fifth season of the Israeli reality program Survivor. The show featured 20 contestants competing for 40 days, and was the third season in a row to be filmed in the Caramoan Peninsula in the Camarines Sur province of the Philippines. The season aired from February 14, 2011 until the live finale on June 19, 2011, when Irit Rahamim Basis was named Sole Survivor over Gev Pesti and Natalie Cabessa by a vote of 6–3–0, and Yaniv Ruhan was awarded the fan favorite award by public vote.

The original concept for the season was to split the players by ethnicity (Ashkenazi vs. people of Sephardic/Mizrahi descent), but was dismissed when rumors drew public criticism. Instead, the season featured a "Haves vs. Have Nots" premise wherein one tribe's camp was furnished with several luxuries, similar to "Survivor: Fiji," the 14th season of the United States' version. The Banao tribe won the furnished camp by winning the opening reward challenge, but both tribes automatically switched camps on Day 6. This twist ended when the tribes were shuffled on Day 12, as both new tribes went to new camps.

Contestants

Season summary

 Survivor Auction: There was no Reward Challenge. Instead, a Survivor Auction was held. Here is what was purchased:

Voting history

Notes

External links 
 Nana 10

2011 Israeli television seasons
Survivor (Israeli TV series)
Channel 10 (Israeli TV channel) original programming
Television shows filmed in the Philippines